John Belanger (born ) is a Canadian former Paralympic athlete. He won medals at the 1984 Summer Paralympics, 1988 Summer Paralympics, and 1994 Winter Paralympics.

References

Living people
1940s births
Paralympic sledge hockey players of Canada
Canadian sledge hockey players
Paralympic track and field athletes of Canada
Paralympic bronze medalists for Canada
Paralympic silver medalists for Canada
Medalists at the 1984 Summer Paralympics
Medalists at the 1988 Summer Paralympics
Medalists at the 1994 Winter Paralympics
Paralympic medalists in sledge hockey
Paralympic medalists in athletics (track and field)
Ice sledge hockey players at the 1994 Winter Paralympics
Athletes (track and field) at the 1984 Summer Paralympics
Athletes (track and field) at the 1988 Summer Paralympics
Canadian male discus throwers
Canadian male javelin throwers
Canadian male shot putters
Discus throwers with limb difference
Javelin throwers with limb difference
Shot putters with limb difference
Paralympic discus throwers
Paralympic javelin throwers
Paralympic shot putters
20th-century Canadian people